Ikuko (written: 郁子 or 育子) is a feminine Japanese given name. Notable people with the name include:

, Japanese politician
, Japanese character designer and animation director
, Japanese classical violinist and composer
, Japanese field hockey player
, Japanese discus thrower
, Japanese actress, voice actress and narrator
, Japanese sprinter
, fictional character in Sailor Moon

Japanese feminine given names